The  is a cab over microvan and kei truck produced and sold by the Japanese automaker Daihatsu since 1960. Despite the similarities between the Hijet name and Toyota's naming scheme for its trucks and vans (HiAce and Hilux), the name "Hijet" has been in use for Daihatsu's kei trucks and microvans since 1960, over two decades before Toyota took control. "Hijet", when transliterated into Japanese, is very similar to "Midget", one of Daihatsu's other mini-trucks. According to Daihatsu, the name "Hijet" was created to imply that the vehicle offers higher performance than the Midget. The Hijet competes in Japan with the Honda Acty, Mitsubishi Minicab, Nissan Clipper, Subaru Sambar and Suzuki Carry.

By November 2020, around 7.4 million Hijets had been sold in Japan.

History 
The first Hijet received a 360 cc two-stroke engine, as was dictated by the kei car laws of the time. The Hijet's development has long followed the evolution of Japan's kei regulations, with an increase to 550 cc in 1976 and then 660 cc for 1990. Export versions have usually been slightly larger as bigger bumpers and sometimes wider bodies are fitted. During 1980, the two millionth Hijet was built.

First generation (L35/L36) 

The first vehicle to bear the name Hijet from Daihatsu was a kei truck in November 1960, with the enclosed light van model following in May 1961. The first generation Hijet used a conventional front engine, rear-wheel-drive format with the driver sitting behind the engine, in a similar pickup fashion. The exterior dimensions and engine displacement were in compliance with "kei class" regulations in Japan at its introduction. As a result, the ability to carry loads was very much reduced. In 1964, the Hijet received a facelift, replacing its body-colored grille with a more conventional chromed unit.

A heavier duty model of the Hijet, the New-Line (L50P/L50V), arrived in January 1963. Developed with an eye to export markets, this car did not meet the strict kei car standards of the time and sold only in small numbers. When the first generation Hijet was replaced in February 1966, the New-Line was discontinued.

Second generation (S35/S36) 

To maximize cargo carrying space while still staying in the "kei" class regulations, a cabover approach was adopted in 1964, offering buyers the choice between the first generation style or the cabover approach. This generation appearance was also introduced as the larger "New Line Cab" Daihatsu cabover truck (S50, S50T), replacing the earlier L50 New Line. As for its predecessor, it shared its engine with the Daihatsu Compagno. The New Line Cab was built from February 1966 until March 1968.

The cabover bodystyle approach appeared after the 1950 Volkswagen Type 2, the 1961 Ford Econoline, the 1961 Chevrolet Greenbrier, and during the same year as the Dodge A100.

Third generation (S37) 

First model change from previous generation saw minor improvements, including rehinging the front doors in the conventional manner as opposed to the earlier rear-hinged doors. The design was boxier over all, with a more wedgy appearance and square headlights in prominent shrouds of a darker colour. This generation was also offered as an all-electric truck and van.

Fourth generation (S38/S40) 

In September 1971, the fourth generation Hijet appeared, with all-new sheetmetal, initially available only as a truck. The engine remained the ZM 360 cc two-stroke two-cylinder, while the rear suspension reverted to a live, leaf-sprung unit. In February 1972, a new Van was presented, originally marketed as the "Slide Van" as it now featured sliding doors on both sides in addition to a top-hinged tailgate. In September 1974, the front clip and rear bumper underwent light changes to accommodate full-size yellow license plates (hitherto, kei cars had been equipped with smaller plates than normal).

In October 1976, the four-stroke Hijet 550 appeared, with the new 550 cc AB20 engine taking full advantage of the recent new kei regulations. Bigger bumpers meant that all Hijets built after this date are slightly longer, as the 360 received the same external changes simultaneously, including a new front clip. To reflect the new engine, the 550 received the new chassis code "S40". The 550 Van had an advantage of a higher carrying capacity than the 360 Van, at 350 rather than 300 kg ( respectively).

Less than a year after the introduction of the 550, the wider and longer Hijet Wide 55 (S60) appeared, but the Hijet 550 continued in production and even underwent a facelift in April 1979 and now carried a blacked out grille. In April 1981, the four-stroke S40 Hijet 550 was discontinued, but the two-stroke S38 continued to be available until August 1981 as a low-cost version (by which time the sixth generation Hijet was already on sale). The later ZM-engined versions had . The two-stroke was also popular in many Southeast Asian markets, where emissions regulations were more lax and its lower purchasing price had a bigger impact.

Fifth generation (S60) 

In April 1977, production of the truck version of the fifth generation began. Called the "Hijet Wide 55", to draw attention to its wider body and bigger 550 cc engine, this was the first Hijet to reach export markets in any serious numbers. The 547 cc AB20 was a four-stroke, water-cooled two-cylinder unit with a single overhead camshaft and balance axle. The only transmission installed is a four-speed manual with a floor-mounted shifter; export versions could reach a claimed  top speed.

The engine is mid-mounted just behind the front axle, and access is gained by simply lifting the front seats. Chassis code is "S60", with the succeeding letter "P" signifying a simple pickup bed with one opening flap; "T" for the three-way dropside pickup; and "V" for the vans.

Three months after the introduction of the pickups (in June 1977), a glassed van with sliding doors and also a "panel van" version were released. The panel van was simply a truck with a box mounted on the rear; this version was not exported. For export, a van version without windows or rear seats was preferred. A low floor dropside bed was added in December 1977, and a minor facelift took place in September 1978. The changes were limited to different colored bumpers and headlight surrounds, and a changed metal grille insert featuring a larger "D" logo. All versions were available in either Standard or Super DeLuxe trims, but in March 1979, a comparatively luxurious "Custom EX" version of the light van was added.

In September 1979, the Hijet Wide 55 underwent a more thorough facelift: A new front clip with a single-piece grille was the most obvious change, while inside there was a new more sculpted dash as well as more comfortable seats which received adjustable backs. The two millionth Hijet was an S60 built during 1980. Production continued until replaced by the sixth generation Hijet in 1981.

Sixth generation (S65/S66/S70/S75/S76) 

In March 1981, the all-new S65 Hijet appeared, now on a slightly longer wheelbase but with the same AB20 engine. New was a flat-floor option for the Vans, and also new was a high-roof option. Most mechanicals were originally the same as before, but in March 1982 the S66, a new four-wheel drive (from October 1983 with optional free-wheel front hubs and front-wheel disc brakes) appeared. From 1982, export versions generally received a torquier 843 cc three-cylinder engine (CD20), called the Daihatsu 850 Cab (S70 series). The 850 also benefitted from twelve-inch wheels rather than the ten-inch ones used on the smaller-engined models. In 1983 a one-liter version was also made available. In un-catalyzed trim, as sold in many export markets, this model produces  JIS at 5600 rpm. The four-wheel-drive Hijet was also exported beginning in 1985. The Hijet 1000 received the S75 model code, with four-wheel drives called S76.

Indonesian-built Hijets (by P.T. Astra International) had a longer body on the same wheelbase, and was available with a variety of locally developed bodywork. They were fitted with the one-litre engine subsequent to a decree by the Indonesian government that the smallest car engine built in the country by 1985 would have to be one liter. The rear portion of the body was developed locally, and the dies were also manufactured in Indonesia, thereby lowering licensing fees and minimizing imports. A variety of different minibus bodystyles were offered by a number of small bodybuilders. This Hijet was the most successful model in the fastest growing segment of the market, and represented one eighth of all local vehicle manufacture in 1983. In late 1985, the Indonesian-market Hijet received a light facelift, featuring a new silver-colored grille with five small openings on the right-hand side. This generation of the Hijet was kept in production in Indonesia until 1992.

Also in 1983, the Hijet Jumbo appeared, a high-roofed extended cab pickup with a shorter bed. This meant that there was space for more comfortable seats, with considerable more travel and folding seatbacks. The resulting rear compartment offered small luggage spaces, a flat-folding passenger seat, and a small luggage rack above. The two-wheel Jumbo was available with a fifth gear, as were some versions of the Atrai passenger van. There was also a Hijet Climber series (two- or four-wheel drive), these were fitted with bigger off-road tires and a limited-slip differential.

The S65 was also sold as the Hijet Atrai Van from September 1981, a version specifically intended for passenger use. From October 1983, this became a separate badge in the Japanese market, where the Atrai remains separate from the more workmanlike Hijets. There was also a handicap accessible version of the Hijet S65V, which could accommodate a folding wheel chair. The most surprising news was probably the addition of a turbocharged version in February 1984, also available with four-wheel drive.

A subsidiary of FAW Tianjin began producing the S65 Hijet in 1984, originally as the Tianjin TJ110 but later as the Huali Dafa. The Chinese-built trucklets were only available with two-wheel drive and the 843 cc three-cylinder CD engine, offering  at 5,500 rpm. The high roof was also available in China. The Huali Dafa was used as a popular taxicab and production ended in 2002.

Seventh generation (S80-S89) 

The seventh generation Hijet (S80, S81 for versions equipped with four-wheel drive) was a gradual development of its predecessor and was introduced in May 1986. The biggest change was the switch to a more modern three-cylinder engine, the EB, although displacement remained just under 550 cc. It was also built in South Korea since 1992, by Asia Motors, as the "Towner". This version was later badged "Kia Towner", subsequent to Kia's takeover. The Asia/Kia vans were only exported to certain markets (such as Malta and Chile), according to the licensing agreement. Beginning in 1992, Piaggio also built this car in Pontedera Italy for European markets as the "Porter". This version has long outlived the original Hijet and is still in production. Unlike the Hijet, the Porter has also been available with a diesel option. 

This was the only generation that was sold in the United States for commercial off road use where it competed with golf carts, electric carts and three-wheeled light duty trucks.

The Japanese market Hijet continued to also be available in the "Jumbo Cab" configuration, but new was the "Deck Van" - a version of the four-door van with a very short cargo bed in the rear. This version was also sold as the Daihatsu Atrai Deck. Export market Hijets generally received Daihatsu's familiar 993 cc three-cylinder engine, while domestic versions had to make do with 550 cc due to the strict Kei rules. Following new Kei car regulations in early 1990, the Hijet was updated accordingly. As with all its brethren, it gained ten centimetres in overall length and 110 cc in displacement. This was enough to give it a new chassis code, S82 (S83 for four-wheel drive models). This version continued in production until being replaced by the eight generation version in 1994.

In May 1987, a supercharged version with  appeared in the Hijet truck. This remained available until the introduction of the larger 660 cc engine in March 1990. The supercharger's superior torque at low engine speeds made this a natural application for a truck such as the Hijet. Conversely, the Atrai passenger car version were available with a more powerful turbo engine right from the start. In September 1992, the Hijet and Atrai received a light facelift, including alterations to both interior and exterior, as well as a number of new engines. The van and pick-up, in addition to a new fuel-injected four-valve option, also received strengthened beds and covers.

An enlarged version of this generation was built in Indonesia as the "Daihatsu Zebra", beginning in 1986, equipped with 1.0-liter 3-cylinder from previous generation. In 1989, this received a 1.3-liter 16-valve HC engine rather than the earlier one-liter unit, and sales doubled year-on-year. The 1298 cc unit produces  and was coupled to a four-speed manual transmission. The pickup truck version started using the "D130 Jumbo" badge.

Eighth generation (S100, S110, S120, S130) 

The eighth generation Hijet entered the marketplace in January 1994, after having first been shown at the 30th Tokyo Motor Show in October 1993, and continued to be built until replaced by the ninth generation in 1999. "S100" was used for two-wheel drive versions, while four-wheel-drives were coded "S110". The suffix "P" was for trucks, "C" for panel vans, and "V" for glazed vans. The passenger-oriented Atrai received "S120" and "S130" chassis codes. In May the "Hijet EV", a fully electric version of the van, appeared - replacing the EV version of the seventh generation Hijet. From January 1996, automatics received a twin-cam 12-valve carburetted version of the EF engine (EF-GS), still with the same power.

In 1995, a Hijet EV Truck appeared, complementing the Van version. Appearing in October 1997, the "Hijet IS" was a youthful version with sporty design traits, including a blacked out front panel and various body cladding items. "IS" stood for "Idol" and "Stylish".

The new Atrai was focused more on passenger comfort than earlier generations, and has a three-link independent rear suspension rather than the leaf sprung, live axle of the Hijet. This is why the Atrai has its own chassis numbers (S120/130). The Atrai passenger van was available with more powerful turbocharged engines, such as the SOHC 6-valve EF-TS and the twin-cam, 12-valve EF-RS (from January 1997). Both of these engines nominally remained beneath the  limit set by Japanese regulators for Kei cars - but with 13.6 percent more torque than the lower tuned single-cam, it was clear to all that the EF-RS had considerably more power than acknowledged. The Turbo SR (and later RT) models received anti-lock brakes as standard. In October 1997, the Atrai Classic appeared; this model has a leather interior and keyless entry, among other equipment improvements.

Ninth generation (S200, S210, S220) 

When the ninth generation Hijet was introduced in 1999, a divergence between the truck and van versions (Cargo) occurred, with the vans now being of a front-engined "semicab" design rather than the mid-engined cabover design retained for the truck. The Hijet Cargo was designed by Italdesign Giugiaro, while the Hijet Truck was an in-house effort. The S200-series vans were replaced by the tenth generation of the Hijet Cargo in 2004, but the ninth generation of the truck remained in production until July 2014. A similar divergence took place in the Suzuki Carry lineup, necessitated by new crash protection legislations enacted for passenger cars. Since the Hijet Cargo also forms the basis for the passenger use Atrai, it too now has a front-mounted engine.

In December 2007, the Hijet Truck was given a minor update, with light changes to the interior and a new front clip. More importantly, the EF-SE and EF-VE engines were replaced by the new generation KF-VE engine, cleaner and with ten percent lower fuel consumption than the earlier model engine. The chassis code was changed to S201/211 to reflect the changes. A landmark was met in December 2010 when Hijet sales surpassed those of the Suzuki Carry, becoming the kei truck market leader for the first time in 39 years. Beginning in December 2011, the S201 Hijet Truck started being sold by Toyota as the Pixis Truck, together with the tenth generation Van. In April 2012, Subaru entered a similar OEM deal with Daihatsu, selling the Hijet S201 and S321 as the Sambar.

The S201/S211 was manufactured until July 2014, remaining on sale for another four months, until it was replaced by the new S500 truck. There are also panel/box van versions of the truck available; these carry a "C" suffix at the end of the chassis number rather than the "P" of the trucks.

A 1.3-liter seven-seat version (S221G) was also offered, sold as the "Daihatsu Atrai 7". It has bigger bumpers and does not qualify as a kei car. In an OEM deal, this car was also sold as the "Toyota Sparky". Another bigger version of ninth generation Hijet for commercial use was sold as "Daihatsu Hijet Gran Cargo" for Japanese market and as "Daihatsu Extol" for international market. It arrived in July 2000 and was built until the last day of November 2004.

Tenth generation (S320, S321, S330, S331, S500, S510)

Hijet Cargo/Atrai (S320, S330) 
The tenth generation Hijet was introduced in December 2004. The tenth generation was only available in van form, with the trucks remaining the ninth generation cabover model until September 2014, when the tenth generation trucks came out. The truck and van lines have diverged completely, sharing mainly the engines and the name. In Japan, the passenger car version of the Hijet is known as the "Daihatsu Atrai", which is also powered by a 660 cc Turbo engine producing . The base model is mid-engined with rear-wheel drive, but four-wheel drive versions (S330-series) are also available.

As of December 2007, the chassis numbers changed from S320/S330 to S321/S331 to reflect the shift to the new, more efficient KF engine. Only the Hijet Cargo Hybrid retained the earlier EF-series engine. The Hybrid was discontinued in April 2010, as the hybrid drive system proved a bit too expensive for a microcar, while returning negligible fuel economy benefits for what is already a very efficient vehicle. In April 2015, the Cargo received a minor update, changing to a new four-speed automatic and an electronic throttle system (as recently introduced on the S500 Hijet Truck). In November 2017, the Hijet/Atrai received a thorough facelift, with a redesigned front treatment with a prominent trapezoidal grille.

The tenth generation Van/Microbus as well as the ninth and tenth generation truck have also been marketed in Japan by Toyota since December 2011. They are called "Toyota Pixis" Van and Truck respectively. As for the Hijet, they have the new KF engine of 660 cc.

Hijet Truck (S500, S510) 
In September 2014, the tenth generation Hijet cabover trucks was introduced, replacing the S200 line which had remained in production for a full fifteen years. The Truck is mid-engined as before, with either rear-wheel drive or optional four-wheel drive (S510). Unlike the ninth generation Hijet Truck, chassis codes end with a "P" for trucks as well as box van versions. As with the S201 predecessor, they have the new KF engine of 660 cc.

In December 2021, the CVT option was introduced for the Hijet Truck.

Hi-Max (S501) 

The tenth generation Hijet Truck was launched in Indonesia as the Daihatsu Hi-Max on 10 November 2016. The Hi-Max has the S501RP chassis number and was assembled at Astra Daihatsu Motor's Sunter plant. It stopped production in November 2019 and was removed from Daihatsu's Indonesian website in April 2020 due to low sales caused by buyers' preference for larger models such as the Gran Max or the Indonesian-built Suzuki Carry. In 2019, only 95 units of Hi-Max were sent to dealerships, compared to nearly 36,000 units of the Gran Max. A total of 1,731 units were sold.

Eleventh generation (S700, S710)

Hijet Cargo/Atrai (S700, S710) 
The eleventh-generation Hijet Cargo/sixth-generation Atrai was introduced on 20 December 2021. It is based on the Daihatsu New Global Architecture.

Variants and derivatives 

There were some versions of the Hijet sold outside Japan, which were available with 1.0 or 1.3-litre engines. These were no longer considered kei cars, as they are wider and longer than allowed by these narrowly defined regulations. The Zebra (also known as the Hijet Maxx/Citivan) was originally derived from the Japanese-market Hijet but later became the separate model. It was also originally a one-litre car but later became available with 1.3 and 1.6 engines. The 1.6 was replaced by a 1.5-liter model in January 2002. The Perodua Rusa is a rebadged Zebra sold by Daihatsu's Malaysian partner, Perodua. In the Japanese market, there was also a larger version of the ninth generation Hijet, sold as the Hijet Gran Cargo. This car has been exported to other right-hand drive markets as the Extol as well.

Piaggio Porter 

The Piaggio Porter was a licensed version of the seventh generation Hijet manufactured in Pontedera, Italy, between 1992 and 2021, and sold with diesel, LPG, CNG or electric motors. These Italian-built vans were also sold with Daihatsu Hijet nameplates in certain market to get around quota restrictions on Japanese-made vehicles, while some passenger versions were also sold as the Innocenti Porter. They were originally equipped with a  1.0 petrol or a  1.2-litre Lombardini diesel. Top speeds for these early models are  respectively. More recent cars receive a 1269 cc petrol/LPG engine or a 1371 cc diesel. The 1.3 offers  in either configuration while the 1.4 diesel only manages . All of these Porter variants (S85) are based on the facelifted seventh generation of the Hijet (S82) which has its front wheel located below the front door and a mid-mounted engine. Since 2013 the Porter has also been manufactured at Piaggio's Baramati plant (Pune, India) for Asian markets.

Indian-made Porters also have various other engine options, such as the Porter 600 which is equipped with a 511 cc CRDs diesel engine producting .

In 2021, Piaggio released the new Porter NP6, but instead of being based on the Hijet it was an Italian-built version of the Chinese Foton T3 van.

Hybrid Hijet 
In 2002, Daihatsu debuted the Hijet Cargo Hybrid concept, a hybrid electric van, in Japan using a 660 cc engine. The car is based on the existing non-hybrid Hijet Cargo. Daihatsu calls it a mild hybrid design. Its design (called Daihatsu Mild Hybrid System or DMHS based on Toyota hybrid technology) is quite different from many existing hybrid design where as the gas and electric powered components assembled as one unit. The electric motor sits between the gasoline-powered engine and the transmission unit. The car is 30% more fuel efficient than its gasoline-powered counterpart.

The hybrid minicars (called FEV and Atrai Hybrid-IV) made their debut in 2002 as a concept minicar. Its production was announced in October 2004 but never entered production as Daihatsu chose to release hybrid versions of newer models instead.

References

External links 

  

Hijet
Vehicles introduced in 1960
Kei trucks
Microvans
Cab over vehicles
Hybrid minivans
Vehicles with CVT transmission